Jennifer Wang may refer to the following people:

Wang Ju-hsuan, Taiwanese politician, Minister of Labor from 2008 to 2012, and 2016 vice presidential candidate
Wang Li-ling, Taiwanese politician, chair of the Financial Supervisory Commission in 2016